Mohammad Reza Sangsefidi (born 2 November 1989) is an Iranian professional futsal player. He is currently a member of Mes Sungun and the Iran national futsal team.

Honours

Country 

 FIFA Futsal World Cup
 Third place (1): 2016
 AFC Futsal Championship
 Champion (2): 2016 - 2018
 Grand Prix
 Runner-Up (1): 2015
 Third Place (1): 2014
 Asian Indoor Games
 Champion (1): 2017

 Chinese Touring 
 Champion (1): 2013

Club 
 AFC Futsal Club Championship
 Champion (2): 2015 (Tasisat Daryaei), 2018 (Mes Sungun)
 Iranian Futsal Super League
 Champions (6): 2013–14 (Dabiri), 2014–15 (Tasisat Daryaei), 2015–16 (Tasisat Daryaei), 2017–18 (Mes Sungun), 2018–19 (Mes Sungun), 2021–22 (Giti Pasand)

International goals

References

External links 
 
 

1989 births
Living people
People from Tehran
Iranian men's futsal players
Dabiri FSC players
Tasisat Daryaei FSC players
Mes Sungun FSC players
Giti Pasand FSC players
Iranian expatriate futsal players